Events from the year 1641 in France.

Incumbents 
Monarch: Louis XIII

Events
 
 
 
 
 
 
 René Descartes' Meditations on First Philosophy is originally published.

Births
 

 
 January 18 – François-Michel le Tellier, Marquis de Louvois, French war minister (d. 1691)
 February 2 – Claude de la Colombière, French Jesuit priest and saint (d. 1682)
 June 15 – Bernard de la Monnoye, French lawyer (d. 1728)
 June 28 – Marie Casimire Louise de La Grange d'Arquien (d. 1716)
 June 29 – Pierre Cholonec, French Jesuit missionary and biographer in New France (d. 1723)
 September 1 – Jean Barbier d'Aucour, French lawyer and satirist (d. 1694)
 November 17 – André, marquis de Nesmond, French naval commander (d. 1702)
 December 7 – Louis, Count of Armagnac, French noble (d. 1718)
 Pierre Allix, French Protestant clergyman (d. 1717)

Deaths

See also

References

1640s in France